Billy Currington is the first studio album by American country music singer Billy Currington. It was released in September 2003 via Mercury Records Nashville. The album produced the singles "Walk a Little Straighter" and "I Got a Feelin'". Both were Top 10 hits on the U.S. Billboard Hot Country Songs chart, peaking at numbers 8 and 5 respectively. The song "Ain't What It Used to Be" was later recorded by Megan Mullins, whose version was released as a single in 2006. Currington co-wrote all but one of the songs on the album.

Track listing

Personnel
 Eddie Bayers - drums 
 Billy Currington - lead vocals
 Stuart Duncan - fiddle 
 Paul Franklin - steel guitar 
 Brent Mason - electric guitar 
 Gordon Mote - keyboards on "Off My Rocker"
 Gary Prim - keyboards on all tracks except "Off My Rocker"
 John Wesley Ryles - background vocals 
 W. David Smith - bass guitar 
 John Willis - acoustic guitar, banjo on "Ain't What It Used to Be"

Chart performance

Album

Singles

References

External links
[ Billy Currington] at Allmusic

2003 debut albums
Billy Currington albums
Mercury Nashville albums
Albums produced by Carson Chamberlain